Frederick Gordon Neil Pearson (March 23, 1923 – September 10, 2009) was an American ice hockey player who competed in ice hockey at the 1948 Winter Olympics.

Pearson was a member of the American ice hockey team which played eight games, but was disqualified, at the 1948 Winter Olympics hosted by St. Moritz, Switzerland.

External links

1923 births
2009 deaths
Ice hockey players from Massachusetts
Ice hockey players at the 1948 Winter Olympics
Olympic ice hockey players of the United States
Sportspeople from Beverly, Massachusetts
American men's ice hockey left wingers